Hugo Adriaensens (18 September 1927 - 30 October 2000) was a Belgian politician. He was a member of the Chamber of Representatives and was senator of Belgium.

References
 Former Mayor Adriaensens van Willebroek died.

Members of the Chamber of Representatives (Belgium)
1927 births
2000 deaths